
Year 360 BC was a year of the pre-Julian Roman calendar. At the time, it was known as the Year of the Consulship of Ambustus and Visolus (or, less frequently, year 394 Ab urbe condita). The denomination 360 BC for this year has been used since the early medieval period, when the Anno Domini calendar era became the prevalent method in Europe for naming years.

Events

By place

Egypt 
 With the help of King Agesilaus II of Sparta, Nectanebo II deposes Teos and becomes king of Egypt. Teos flees to Susa and makes peace with the Persians. Nectanebo II pays the Spartans 230 talents for their help.

Judea 
 Jerusalem has been rebuilt and the power of Judaism's hereditary priesthood is firmly established.

Greece 
 The King of Sparta, Agesilaus II, dies at Cyrene, Cyrenaica, on his way home to Greece from Egypt. He is succeeded by his son Archidamus III as Eurypontid king of Sparta.
 As the Illyrians attack the Molossians, the Molossian king Arymbas brings his non-combatant people to safety elsewhere. When the Illyrians have finished looting, they are burdened with booty and are thus easily defeated by the Molossians.

Roman Republic 
 The Gauls again reach the gates of Rome, but are beaten back.

By topic

Literature 
 Plato writes the dialogues Timaeus and Critias, first mentioning Atlantis.

Births 
 Callisthenes of Olynthus, Greek historian (d. 327 BC)
 Lysimachus, Macedonian diadochus (d. 281 BC)
 Pyrrho of Elis, Greek skeptic philosopher (d. c. 270 BC)

Deaths 
 Agesilaus II, Eurypontid king of Sparta (b. c.444 BC)

References